Wesel-Feldmark is a railway station in Wesel, North Rhine-Westphalia, Germany. The station is located on the Arnhem-Oberhausen railway. The train services are operated by VIAS.

Train services
The station is served by the following services:

Regional services  Arnhem - Emmerich - Wesel - Oberhausen - Duisburg - Düsseldorf

References

External links
NIAG Website 

Railway stations in North Rhine-Westphalia
Wesel